The .460 Rowland is a handgun cartridge designed in 1997 by Johnny Rowland and developed in conjunction with Clark Custom Guns. Its overall cartridge length is identical to the .45 ACP, but with an increased case length, allowing for ballistic performance comparable to a .44 Magnum.

References

External links 
 Official website
Pistol and rifle cartridges